was a Japanese composer.

Biography
Irino was born in Soviet Vladivostok. He attended high school in Tokyo and went on to study economics at Tokyo Imperial University (now University of Tokyo).

After World War II, Irino, along with colleagues Minao Shibata and Kunio Toda, studied the twelve-tone method of composition devised by Arnold Schoenberg. In 1951, Irino used the composition technique to compose his Concerto da Camera for Seven Instruments. This work is credited to be the first Japanese dodecaphonic composition. During the same time, the magazine Ongaku Geijutsu published two articles by Irino: "Schoenberg's Composing Technique" and "What is Twelve-Tone Music?" Subsequently, Irino used the twelve-tone technique in numerous compositions and wrote extensively about contemporary music. Working to introduce foreign contemporary music and music literature to Japan, he made Japanese translations of important books such as Die Komposition mit zwölf Tönen (12音による作曲技法) by Josef Rufer and Schoenberg and His School (シェーンベルクとその楽派) by René Leibowitz. Irino did not, however, compose serial music, a technique of the same period widely used with the Darmstadt School.

In 1973, the Asian Composers League was established by Irino and his colleagues. After his death, the Irino Award and the Yoshiro Irino Memorial Prize (sponsored by the Asian Composers League) were established to promote young composers. Notable students include Kimi Sato.

Awards 
 6th Mainichi Music Award for Sinfonietta (1953)
 6th Odaka Award for Concerto Grosso for Double String and Wind Orchestras (1957)
 8th Odaka Award for Symphonia (1959)

Works 
Yoshirō Irino's music is mainly published by Zen-On Music Company Ltd, Ongaku No Tomo Sha, 

Stage works
 , Music for the Noh Drama (1962)

Orchestra
 Adagietto and Allegro Vivace (1949)
 Sinfonietta for Small Orchestra (1953)
 Ricercari for Small Orchestra (1954)
 Double Concerto for Violin, Piano and Orchestra (1955)
 Concerto Grosso for Double String and Wind Orchestras (1957)
 Symphonia (1959)
 Concerto for String Orchestra (1960)
 Music for Harpsichord, Percussion and 19 Strings (1963)
 Symphonia No. 2 (1964)
 Theme and Variations (1967)
  for Two Shakuhachi and Orchestra (1973)

Jazz band
 Suite for Jazz Band (1960)

Chamber music
 Sonata for Cello and Piano (1945)
 String Quartet No. 1 (1945)
 Sonatina for Flute and Piano (1946)
 Piano Trio, Op. 4 (1948)
 String Sextet (1950)
 Concerto da Camera for Seven Instruments (1951)
 Quintet for Clarinet, Alto Saxophone, Trumpet, Cello and Piano (1958)
 Divertimento for Seven Winds (1958)
 Music for Violin and Cello (1959)
 Music for Vibraphone and Piano (1961)
 Partita for Wind Quintet (1962)
 String Trio (1965)
 Three Movements for Two Kotos and Jūshichi-gen (1966)
 Seven Inventions for Guitar and Six Players (1967)
 Sonata for Violin and Piano (1967)
 Duo concertante for Shakuhachi and Koto (1968)
 Three Movements for Cello Solo (1969)
 Sonata for Four Players (1970)
 Trio for H.R.S. '70 for Flute, Violin and Harpsichord (1970)
 Globus I for Horn and Percussion (1971)
 Suite for Viola Solo (1971)
 Globus II for Marimba, Percussion and Double Bass (1971)
 Strömung for Flute, Harp and Percussion (1973)
 Globus III for Hichiriki, Violin, Cello Harp, Piano and Two Dancers (1975)
 Klänge for Piano and Percussion (1976)
  for Marimba Solo (1977)
 Cosmos for Shakuhachi, Two Sō (Koto), Violin, Piano and Percussion (1978)

Piano
 Variations (1943)
 Three Pieces (1958)
 Music for Two Pianos (1963)
  (1967)
 Three Little Pieces (1967–68)
 Four Small Pieces (1969)
 Piano Pieces for Children (1972–75)

Vocal
  (1959)
  for Mixed Chorus and Percussion (1960)
  (1966)
  for Soprano and Tenor with Harp and Harpsichord (1977)

Film music
  (1958)
  (1961)
  (1964); based on the novel by Yukio Mishima

School songs
 Irino wrote school songs for about two dozen Japanese schools.

References

External links 
 Yoshiro Irino Institute of Music
 Asian Composers League

1921 births
1980 deaths
20th-century classical composers
20th-century Japanese composers
20th-century Japanese male musicians
Japanese classical composers
Japanese film score composers
Japanese male classical composers
Japanese male film score composers